The 2013 Visit Panamá Cup was a professional tennis tournament played on clay courts. It was the second edition of the tournament which was part of the 2013 ATP Challenger Tour. It took place in Panama City, Panama between 15 and 21 April 2013.

Singles main draw entrants

Seeds

 1 Rankings are as of April 8, 2013.

Other entrants
The following players received wildcards into the singles main draw:
  Flavio Cipolla
  Walner Espinoza
  Nicolás Massú
  Jesse Witten

The following players received entry as a special exempt into the singles main draw:
  Axel Michon

The following players received entry from the qualifying draw:
  Iván Endara
  Víctor Estrella
  Gerald Melzer
  Ricardo Rodríguez

The following player received entry as a lucky loser:
  Florian Reynet

Doubles main draw entrants

Seeds

1 Rankings as of April 8, 2013.

Other entrants
The following pairs received wildcards into the doubles main draw:
  Sam Barnett /  Cătălin-Ionuț Gârd
  Iván Endara /  Walner Espinoza
  Nicolás Massú /  Guillermo Rivera Aránguiz

Champions

Singles

 Rubén Ramírez Hidalgo def.  Alejandro González, 6–4, 5–7, 7–6(7–4)

Doubles

 Jorge Aguilar /  Sergio Galdós def.  Alejandro González /  Julio César Campozano, 6–4, 6–4

External links
Official Website

Visit Panama Cup
Visit Panamá Cup